Surehvan (also Romanized as Sūrehvān; also known as Sūrahbān, Sūrbān, Sūreban, Sūrehbān, Sūrehyān, and Sūzhebān) is a village in Kalatrazan Rural District, Kalatrazan District, Sanandaj County, Kurdistan Province, Iran. At the 2006 census, its population was 170, in 38 families. The village is populated by Kurds.

References 

Towns and villages in Sanandaj County
Kurdish settlements in Kurdistan Province